Eilon is a kibbutz in northern Israel. Located a mile south of Lebanese border and six miles east of the Mediterranean coast, the kibbutz sits on a ridge between two streams, Nahal Betzet and Nahal Kziv and falls under the jurisdiction of Mateh Asher Regional Council.

Etymology
The name Eilon is derived from Elah (pistacia) and Allon (oak), two tree species abundant in this heavily forested area of northern Israel, though specifically referred to the "remnants of ancient trees in the vicinity."  The Polish-Jewish immigrants cleared the forest and planted orchards to feed a small population on a rocky hillside.

History

The kibbutz, situated a short distance from the Lebanese border, was established in 1938 on 400 dunams of land in Khirbet Samak, which had been purchased by the Jewish National Fund. It was settled that year by a group of Polish immigrants and Palestinian Jews. The inhabitants found themselves under constant fire in the wake of the 1936–1939 Arab revolt in Palestine. Eilon was one of the early tower and stockade settlements.

By 1947 the kibbutz had a population of 350, successfully reclaiming rocky land that had been designated by the British Mandatory government as uncultivable. The kibbutz was initially affiliated with Hashomer Hatzair.  Calm was achieved after the Galilee was cleared of Lebanese troops and Kaukji's bands in November 1948.  When the Israeli forces, having just occupied the town of Tarshisha appeared coming up the path the inhabitants defending the kibbutz could hardly believe their good fortune.

Economy

Eilon derives its income from agriculture (bananas, avocado, exotic fruit, cotton); industry (Eshet Eilon manufactures agri-industrial systems to sort vegetables and fruit; Eilon Mosaic  manufactures decorative mosaic); and tourism (Keshet Eilon Country Lodging is a guesthouse). A world-renowned violin master course called Keshet Eilon takes place annually in Eilon. Under the musical directorship of Itzhak Rashkovsky, fifty young violinists from around the world spend each summer receiving extensive violin instruction and performing concerts.

Volunteers
Eilon accepts a number of International Volunteers that in return for lodgings, meals and laundry, work in a variety of locations on the kibbutz.  One of the highlights of being a volunteer is the Vollies (Volunteers) Bar, which is situated close to the volunteers quarters.

References

Kibbutzim
Kibbutz Movement
Populated places established in 1938
Jewish villages in Mandatory Palestine
Populated places in Northern District (Israel)
Polish-Jewish culture in Israel
1938 establishments in Mandatory Palestine